Alex Fidow (born 19 August 1997) is a New Zealand rugby union player who plays for the  in the Super Rugby competition.  His position of choice is prop.

References 

1997 births
New Zealand sportspeople of Samoan descent
New Zealand people of Tokelauan descent
New Zealand rugby union players
Living people
Rugby union props
Wellington rugby union players
Hurricanes (rugby union) players
Rugby union players from Wellington City
North Harbour rugby union players